The Seafarer 22 is an American trailerable sailboat that was designed by McCurdy & Rhodes as a cruiser and first built in 1976.

Production
The design was built by Seafarer Yachts in Huntington, New York in the United States, starting in 1976, but it is now out of production.

Design
The Seafarer 22 is a recreational keelboat, built predominantly of fiberglass with a balsa-cored deck. It has a masthead sloop rig, a raked stem, a slightly reverse transom, a skeg-mounted rudder controlled by a tiller and a fixed fin or optional shoal draft keel. It displaces  and carries  of lead ballast.

The shoal draft keel model also had a transom-mounted, vertically lifting rudder.

There were also two deck designs available for the same hull, the earlier production "Futura" deck, which was more streamlined and had only one port per side or the later "Standard" deck with two cabin ports per side or.

The boat is normally fitted with a small  outboard motor for docking and maneuvering.

The design has sleeping accommodation for four people, with a double "V"-berth in the bow cabin and two straight settee berths in the main cabin around a folding table. The galley is located on the port side just aft of the bow cabin. The galley is equipped with a sink. The head is located in the bow cabin under the "V"-berth.

Operational history
In a 2010 review Steve Henkel wrote, "the first of a long line of McCurdy & Rhodes designs for Seafarer Fiberglass Yachts of Huntington, NY ... This model featured a streamlined forward deck and only one portlight on each side. Later versions of the '22' used a new deck molding, with extra ports that give more light below, and also offered a choice of two keels, either the 2' 10" so-called 'high performance' keel ... designed primarily for better stability and speed, or a 2' 1" keel for easier launching and retrieving from a trailer. Best features: The coaming on the early boats ... curled up over the cabin-top to ease attachment of a weather-tight dodger, a great convenience when cruising in rainy weather. Worst features: The shoal-keel version's performance will not satisfy most sailors, and the smaller, shallower rudder that is needed to match the shoal keel will not perform as well either. We recommend sticking with the 'high performance' version—which can't be expected to match her comp[etitor]s upwind pointing ability, since she's just not deep enough. The skeg-mounted rudder in both early and late versions has been known to develop problems at the gudgeons. In the early one-port-per-side boats, some owners have sawn holes for new ports to secure additional light below."

See also
List of sailing boat types

References

External links

Photo of a Seafarer 22 with the earlier Futura deck

Keelboats
1970s sailboat type designs
Sailing yachts
Trailer sailers
Sailboat type designs by McCurdy & Rhodes
Sailboat types built by Seafarer Yachts